Sabratha Stadium is a football stadium in Sabratha, Libya. It is the home ground of Wefaq Sabratha.

Football venues in Libya